The Gerard P. Kuiper Airborne Observatory (KAO) was a national facility operated by NASA to support research in infrared astronomy. The observation platform was a highly modified Lockheed C-141A Starlifter jet transport aircraft (s/n: 6110, registration: N714NA, callsign: NASA 714) with a range of 6,000 nautical miles (11,000 km), capable of conducting research operations at altitudes of up to 48,000 feet (14 km).

Aircraft
The KAO was based at the Ames Research Center, NAS Moffett Field, near Sunnyvale, California. Prior to its conversion to the airborne observatory, it had served as Lockheed's demonstrator for a potential civilian version of the C-141.

Though it began operation in 1974 as a replacement for an earlier aircraft, the Galileo Observatory (itself a converted Convair 990 (N711NA) that was destroyed in a collision with a U.S. Navy Lockheed P-3C Orion patrol aircraft in 1973), the KAO wasn't dedicated until May 21, 1975. The KAO flew at altitudes of 41,000 to 45,000 feet, and flew a total of 1,417 times.

The KAO has a 160-foot wingspan, measures 145 feet long, and stands 39 feet high. A typical crew consisted of two pilots, a flight engineer, the mission staff, and the flight team, and the aircraft provided a stable platform for missions lasting up to seven and a half hours. The KAO flew mostly out of Moffett Field, but also flew out of New Zealand, Australia, American Samoa, Panama, Japan, Guam, Brazil, Ecuador, Chile, Houston (Texas), and Hawaii.

During a flight in 1978 that took off from American Samoa, two of the observatory's four engines failed soon after takeoff, and after the aircraft staggered and instrument power was shut down, the flight engineer had to crank down the landing gear manually.

Telescope
The KAO's telescope was a conventional Cassegrain reflector with a 36-inch (91.5 cm) aperture, designed primarily for observations in the 1 to 500 μm spectral range.  Its flight capability allowed it to rise above almost all of the water vapor in the Earth's atmosphere (allowing observations of infrared radiation, which is blocked before reaching ground-based facilities), as well as travel to almost any point on the Earth's surface for an observation.

History
The KAO made several major discoveries, including the first sightings of the rings of Uranus in 1977 and a definitive identification of an atmosphere on Pluto in 1988.  The KAO was used to study the origin and distribution of water and organic molecules in regions of star formation, and in the vast spaces between the stars. Kuiper astronomers also studied the disks surrounding certain stars that may be related to the formation of planetary systems around these stars. It took infrared spectrum measurements of the planet Mercury in 1995. No quartz or olivine in Mercury's surface rocks was detected.

Peering still deeper into space, KAO astronomers studied powerful far-infrared emissions from the center of our galaxy and other galaxies. Scientists on board the KAO tracked the formation of heavy elements like iron, nickel, and cobalt from the massive fusion reactions of supernova SN 1987A.

The KAO was retired in 1995 and is viewable at Moffett Field, although it is no longer airworthy. It has been succeeded by a Boeing 747-based airborne observatory equipped with a larger aperture telescope, the Stratospheric Observatory for Infrared Astronomy (SOFIA). SOFIA completed its first test flight on April 26, 2007 and its telescope saw first light on May 26, 2010. Initial "routine" science observation flights began in December 2010 and the observatory was at full capability with about 100 flights per year. SOFIA was recently retired, with its last flight on September 30, 2022.

See also
Gerard Kuiper
Stratospheric Observatory for Infrared Astronomy (SOFIA)
Infrared astronomy

References

External links

About the Kuiper Airborne Observatory
Infrared Astronomy: The Kuiper Airborne Observatory
Live from the Stratosphere
The Compact Cosmic Ray Telescope aboard the Kuiper Airborne Observatory
Kuiper Airborne Observatory Marks 30th Anniversary of its Dedication
NASA's Kuiper Airborne Observatory, 1971–1995:An Operations Retrospective With a View to SOFIA nasa.gov

Airborne observatories
NASA vehicles
Ames Research Center
Individual aircraft
Gerard Kuiper